Trewindle is a hamlet west of West Taphouse, Cornwall, England, United Kingdom.

References

Hamlets in Cornwall